Microcrambon is a monotypic moth genus of the family Crambidae described by Stanisław Błeszyński in 1970. Its single species, Microcrambon paphiellus, described by Achille Guenée in 1862, is endemic to Réunion and Seychelles.

See also
 List of moths of Réunion

References

Crambinae
Monotypic moth genera
Crambidae genera
Lepidoptera of Réunion
Endemic fauna of Seychelles
Fauna of Seychelles
Moths of Africa
Taxa named by Stanisław Błeszyński